The 1971 Drybrough Cup was the first staging of Scotland's summer football competition. The competition was won by Aberdeen, who defeated Celtic 2–1 in the final.

Quarter-finals

Semi-finals

Final

References

1971–72 in Scottish football